Adaprolol is a beta blocker.

References 

Adamantanes
Antihypertensive agents
Beta blockers
Carboxylate esters
N-isopropyl-phenoxypropanolamines